Binna Burra is a village in the Northern Rivers region of New South Wales, Australia.

References 

Towns in New South Wales
Northern Rivers